King Ai of Chu (died 228 BC), born Xiong You, was a king of Chu during the late Warring States period of ancient China. He was the son of King Kaolie of Chu and full younger brother of King You of Chu.

Prince You succeeded his elder brother as king in 228 BC, but was murdered only two months later by the supporters of his elder half-brother Prince Fuchu. Prince Fuchu ascended the throne as king of Chu.

References 

Monarchs of Chu (state)
Chinese kings
3rd-century BC Chinese monarchs
228 BC deaths
Year of birth unknown